Gym Class Heroes is an American rap rock band from Geneva, New York. The group formed in 1997 when Travie McCoy met drummer Matt McGinley during their high school gym class. The band's music displays a wide variety of influences, including hip hop, rock, funk, and reggae. After the addition of guitarist Disashi Lumumba-Kasongo and bassist Eric Roberts in 2003, the group was signed to Fueled by Ramen and Decaydance Records (Fall Out Boy bassist Pete Wentz's independent record label), on which they released their debut album, The Papercut Chronicles. The group gained a strong fanbase while promoting the album, appearing at festivals such as The Bamboozle and Vans Warped Tour.

In 2006, the group released the gold-selling album As Cruel as School Children. Since that release, the band's single "Cupid's Chokehold" peaked at number four on the Billboard Hot 100, and peaked within the top ten of the charts in various countries, including the United Kingdom, and "Clothes Off!!" peaked within the top ten of the charts in Finland, the Republic of Ireland, and the United Kingdom. On September 9, 2008, Gym Class Heroes released their third album, The Quilt, which contained numerous collaborations with other artists. The band went on hiatus in 2009, a time in which the members pursued various side projects. McCoy released his solo debut album Lazarus in June 2010. Lumumba-Kasongo has been working on his side-project Soul, while McGinley now drums in the rock group Kill the Frontman. The group released The Papercut Chronicles II on November 15, 2011.

History

1997–1998: Formation
Rapper Travie McCoy and drummer Matt McGinley became friends at their local high school in ninth grade in Geneva, New York. They officially came together in 1997. The band formed when bassist Ryan Geise and drummer Matt McGinley were performing at a party in an instrumental band with no vocals. McCoy, who was in attendance at the party, took the microphone onstage and started rapping. A week later, the group came together and started making music.

1998–2001: Hed Candy, Greasy Kid Stuff, and ...For the Kids
The original group began playing college parties and BBQs, birthday parties, clubs, and festivals which eventually led to larger venues throughout the northeast, including four years on Warped Tour (2003, 2004, 2006, 2008). McCoy won MTV's Direct Effect MC Battle and as a prize, appeared in Styles P's video "Daddy Get That Cash". The group had three more releases from 1999 to 2004: Hed Candy, Greasy Kid Stuff, and ...For the Kids.

2002–2005: The Papercut EP, The Papercut Chronicles, and Bonacci's and Geise's departure
In 2003 the band recorded the album The Papercut Chronicles while on tour. The members were not even finished working on the album, as it caught the attention of Fall Out Boy's bassist Pete Wentz, who signed the group to his offspring Fueled By Ramen label, Decaydance Records. At this time, guitarist Milo Bonacci (who went on to form Ra Ra Riot) parted ways with the band and was replaced with current guitarist Disashi Lumumba-Kasongo (brother of the rapper Sammus), who was attending Cornell University at the time. On the first day the band began to rehearse with Lumumba-Kasongo, "Cupid's Chokehold" was written, which would become the album's first single. McGinley recalled, "We just had intentions of working him in on old songs, but we ended up jamming on this Supertramp thing for a minute and got carried away and wrote a song." The group released the four-song Papercut Chronicles EP before finally releasing The Papercut Chronicles in February 2005. After Eric Roberts replaced Ryan Geise on bass, the group toured constantly throughout 2005, appearing at the year's SXSW, The Bamboozle, and Warped Tour festivals. Music videos were filmed for the songs "Taxi Driver" and "yes".

2006–2007: As Cruel as School Children
In May 2006, WXSS, a radio station in Milwaukee, began playing "Cupid's Chokehold" shortly before the release of the band's second full-length album, As Cruel as School Children. The group's manager, Scott Nagelberg stated "As more stations added it, it became undeniable: This was the chance for this band to make it happen." Although the band intended to promote a different song, "The Queen and I" as the album's lead single, the label shifted its focus to "Cupid's Chokehold". The group became frustrated with its association with the song after its scheduled performance of "The Queen and I" on Jimmy Kimmel Live! was changed to "Cupid's Chokehold" last minute. However, McGinley later stated, "Eventually, we saw the rationale. It's a little awkward, but it's still Gym Class Heroes. At the end of the day, it's a good song we all believe in, so we're happy it's getting a lot of attention." It became the band's most successful single, peaking at number four on the Billboard Hot 100. On July 25, 2006, Gym Class Heroes released As Cruel as School Children. The record contained guest appearances by Patrick Stump of Fall Out Boy and William Beckett from The Academy Is.... The album marked a departure in the band's sound, with the band utilizing drum machines and synthesizers as opposed to the band's typical live instrumentation. The band also gained popularity when McCoy was featured in the Cobra Starship song "Snakes on a Plane (Bring It)", which was featured on the soundtrack to the film.

2008: The Quilt

After headlining a seven-week U.S. tour called the "Daryl Hall for President Tour '07", the group returned to the studio to record new material. The resulting material became The Quilt, which was released on September 9, 2008. The album featured numerous collaborations with other artists, including Daryl Hall (from Hall & Oates), The-Dream, Estelle, and Busta Rhymes. Guitarist Disashi Lumumba-Kasongo said of the album, "I would definitely say that this is the most collaborative album I've played on with the band. I remember the very first day we started jamming out and working on the songs. I thought, Man, I haven't felt like this since I was in high school jamming out in a garage.

So it's kind of cool, 'cause it was that same feeling, except we were recording for a major album." Gym Class Heroes co-headlined the 2008 Warped Tour along with Fueled by Ramen label mates Paramore. While the band was performing onstage at the festival on July 2, 2008, Travie McCoy was arrested after hitting a man on the head with his microphone. The man had been in the crowd at a concert in St. Louis when he shouted racial slurs at McCoy. McCoy asked the man, "What did you just call me?" As security was removing the man from the venue, McCoy brought the man on stage to call him out in front of the crowd. In a statement, McCoy's publicist said that the man hit McCoy's knee, which was in a brace after he had suffered a recent strain.

2009–2011: Side projects
Travie McCoy has pursued a solo career. In 2010, he released a hit single "Billionaire" with Bruno Mars, which has been successful since its UK release in early May 2010 and also featured in Taio Cruz's single "Higher". He released his first solo album, Lazarus, on June 8, 2010. Lumumba-Kasongo created the side-project Soul in 2008, which he has currently been focusing on during Gym Class Heroes' break. The songs "Live a Little" and "No Place Left to Run" from The Quilt were originally intended to be used strictly for his side project, but McCoy heard the songs and convinced Lumumba-Kasongo to let Gym Class Heroes use the songs. McGinley has been drumming in the rock group Kill the Frontman.

2011–2019: The Papercut Chronicles II and inactivity
McCoy had discussed the band's new album, The Papercut Chronicles II, "We're about 12 demos deep. All I got to say is it's definitely going back to the essence of Gym Class Heroes, which is four dudes sitting in a room, vibing off each other and making organic, dark metal." On June 9, 2011, Gym Class Heroes released a song entitled "Stereo Hearts" which features Adam Levine from Maroon 5. It was the first single to be released from The Papercut Chronicles II. It became available for download on iTunes on June 14, 2011. It peaked at No. 4 on the Billboard Hot 100. On October 18, 2011, Gym Class Heroes released a song entitled "Life Goes On" which features Oh Land. It is the first and only promotional single to be released from The Papercut Chronicles II. On October 31, the band released their second single of the album, "Ass Back Home", featuring Neon Hitch via iTunes. The third single "The Fighter" features Ryan Tedder from OneRepublic and was released on November 8, 2011, one week before the album's release on November 15. On November 20, 2011, Gym Class Heroes performed "Stereo Hearts" with Adam Levine on the American Music Awards of 2011. The video for the fourth single, "Martyrial Girls", premiered on Fueled by Ramen's YouTube channel on August 27, 2012. Following the release of the single, the group ceased activity and entered a hiatus.

In 2018, the band returned to playing live, opening for 311 and The Offspring on their Never Ending Summer Tour. They were set to perform on the Vans Warped Tour 25th Anniversary Show in Atlantic City before abruptly breaking up again. In 2019, McCoy stated in an interview that Gym Class Heroes was still on a hiatus, with an uncertain duration.

2023: Return from hiatus and When We Were Young Festival

On October 11, 2022, When We Were Young Festival announced the band as part of the line-up for the 2023 edition of the festival, seemingly confirming the end of the band's hiatus.

Musical style and influences
AllMusic describes them as a "unique alternative-funk-rap outfit" and also states that their sounds melds elements of rap, rock, R&B, and funk into one cohesive and melodic sound. Their sound has also been described as a mix of alternative hip hop and pop-rap. McCoy says of the band's musical style, "We've been the proverbial sore thumb our entire career. Even before we got signed to Fueled by Ramen, we were playing shows with death metal and hardcore bands and whoever would let us play with them. I wouldn't even consider us a hip-hop band. Musically, it's just all over the place." The band acknowledges '80s
funk-influenced R&B acts such as Prince and Ready for the World as major influences on its sound. Each member draws from different types of music for inspiration, with drummer Matt McGinley saying "there aren’t many [types of music] we agree on." McCoy cites 1970s blue-eyed soul group Hall & Oates as his biggest musical influence.

Guitarist Disashi Lumumba-Kasango is mainly influenced by rock music, citing Jimi Hendrix and Muse as an inspiration for his guitar playing. Bassist Eric Roberts incorporates elements of reggae into his playing, as well as styles influenced by metal bands such as The Dillinger Escape Plan and Meshuggah. McGinley favors funk and rock stylistics inspired by groups such as Green Day, Red Hot Chili Peppers, and 311. Additionally, the band is noted for not using samples in its music, a practice commonly used in hip-hop. McCoy states that "It’s more fun and organic in the live show. There’s definitely a lot of acts that can pull off a DJ/MC thing but then a lot that can’t. Also I guess it’s all we know." However, As Cruel as School Children does contain samples, with McGinley commenting, "We’ve always been a band and we never did sampling at all before but within the last couple of years we’ve embraced it more. In the songs we did with Patrick Stump we used it."

Band members 

Former members
 Travie McCoy – lead vocals (1997–2012, 2018–2019)
 Matt McGinley – drums, percussion (1997–2012, 2018–2019)
 Disashi Lumumba-Kasongo – guitar, backing vocals (2004–2012, 2018–2019)
 Ralfy Valencia – bass guitar (2018–2019)
 Ryan Geise – bass guitar (1997–2005)
 Milo Bonacci – guitar, vocals (1997–2004)
 Steve Decker – sampler (1997–2003)
 Jason Amsel – guitar (2000–2001)
 Eric Roberts – bass guitar, backing vocals (2005–2018)

Former touring members
Marc DeJesus – hype man (2006–2012)
Tyler Pursel – keyboards, rhythm guitar, backing vocals (2006–2012, 2018–2019)
Joseph Veazie – hype man, clean vocals (2018–2019)

Timeline

Discography 

 ...For the Kids (2001)
 The Papercut Chronicles (2005)
 As Cruel as School Children (2006)
 The Quilt (2008)
 The Papercut Chronicles II (2011)

Awards and nominations

References

External links 

[ Complete discography of Gym Class Heroes], Billboard
GCH's Travis McCoy, Spin, January 2009

Interviews
Interview in Blender
Interview in Clash
Interview in Submerge Magazine, October 2009

American hip hop groups
Crush Management artists
Decaydance Records artists
Fueled by Ramen artists
Indie rock musical groups from New York (state)
Alternative hip hop groups
Alternative rock groups from New York (state)
Watchmen Recording Studios
Musical groups established in 1997
1997 establishments in New York (state)
American pop music groups
Ithaca High School (Ithaca, New York) alumni